Shake You Down is the debut album from R&B singer-songwriter Gregory Abbott.  It was self-written and produced, being released by Columbia Records in 1986.

In the US, two singles were released from the record (Europe saw a third single-release with "You're My Angel"); the title track was a massive hit single, reaching the top spot on the Billboard Hot 100 in 1986.  The other, "I Got The Feelin' (It's Over)" was an R&B hit as well, reaching number 5 on that chart.  On the strength of the singles, the album went platinum; it reached that certification on February 2, 1987.

Reception
The Village Voice critic Robert Christgau said that Abbott tries to be "a great love man without a great voice", but "by reinventing a black pop of modest means, he takes a first step toward returning that great crossover in the sky to the people."

AllMusic's Craig Lytle retrospectively gave the recording 4 of 5 stars, saying it
"has an even flow. All the tracks have that mid-tempo rhythm. The quality vocals, light production touches, and effervescent melodies are attractive attributes."

Track listing
All songs written and produced by Gregory Abbott. (Copyright CBS Songs/Control)
"I Got the Feelin' (It's Over)" – 4:05
"Say You Will" – 4:00
"Shake You Down" – 4:05
"You're My Angel" – 3:55
"Magic" – 4:02
"Wait Until Tomorrow" – 3:51
"Rhyme and Reason" – 3:36
"I'll Find a Way" – 4:07

Personnel
Gregory Abbott: lead & backing vocals, keyboards, Roland TR-808, percussion, arrangements
David Beal: drums (2, 3, 5)
Robert Deadmon: backing vocals (3)
Aida Foreman: backing vocals
Marlon Graves: guitars
John Licitra: flute, saxophone
Alan Palanker: keyboards, co-arrangements (2–5, 7, 8)
T.M. Stevens: bass
Michael Boddicker: Yamaha DX7

Production
Executive Producer: Charles Koppelman
Produced by Gregory Abbott
Recorded and Engineered by Gerry Comito
Design: Mark Larson
Photography: Raul Vega

Certifications

Notes

External links

1986 debut albums
Gregory Abbott albums
Columbia Records albums